West Avenue may refer to:
West Avenue (Xi'an), a major thoroughfare in China
West Avenue (Quezon City), one of the major roads in Quezon City, Metro Manila, Philippines